Kayacı is a village in the Mazgirt District, Tunceli Province, Turkey. The village is populated by Kurds of the Bamasur and Izol tribes and had a population of 37 in 2021.

The hamlets of Güldermez and Mustafa are attached to the village.

References 

Villages in Mazgirt District
Kurdish settlements in Tunceli Province